Walter Brown "Brownie" McGhee (November 30, 1915 – February 16, 1996) was an American folk music and Piedmont blues singer and guitarist, best known for his collaboration with the harmonica player Sonny Terry.

Life and career
McGhee was born in Knoxville, Tennessee, and grew up in Kingsport, Tennessee. At about the age of four he contracted polio, which incapacitated his right leg. His brother Granville "Stick" McGhee, who also later became a musician and composed the famous song "Drinkin' Wine Spo-Dee-o-Dee," was nicknamed for pushing young Brownie around in a cart. Their father, George McGhee, was a factory worker, known around University Avenue for playing guitar and singing. Brownie's uncle made him a guitar from a tin marshmallow box and a piece of board.

McGhee spent much of his youth immersed in music, singing with a local harmony group, the Golden Voices Gospel Quartet, and teaching himself to play guitar. He also played the five-string banjo and ukulele and studied piano. Surgery funded by the March of Dimes enabled McGhee to walk.

At the age of 22, McGhee became a traveling musician, working in the Rabbit Foot Minstrels and befriending Blind Boy Fuller, whose guitar playing influenced him greatly. After Fuller's death in 1941, J. B. Long of Columbia Records promoted McGhee as "Blind Boy Fuller No. 2".  By that time, McGhee was recording for Columbia's subsidiary Okeh Records in Chicago, but his real success came after he moved to New York in 1942, when he teamed up with Sonny Terry, whom he had known since 1939, when Terry was Fuller's harmonica player.  The pairing was an overnight success. They recorded and toured together until around 1980.  As a duo, Terry and McGhee did most of their work from 1958 until 1980, spending 11 months of each year touring and recording dozens of albums.

Despite their later fame as "pure" folk artists playing for white audiences, in the 1940s Terry and McGhee had attempted to be successful recording artists, fronting a jump blues combo with honking saxophone and rolling piano, variously calling themselves "Brownie McGhee and his Jook House Rockers" or "Sonny Terry and his Buckshot Five", often with Champion Jack Dupree and Big Chief Ellis. They also appeared in the original Broadway productions of Finian's Rainbow and Cat on a Hot Tin Roof.

During the blues revival of the 1960s, Terry and McGhee were popular on the concert and music festival circuits, occasionally adding new material but usually remaining faithful to their roots and playing to the tastes of their audiences.

Late in his life, McGhee appeared in small roles in films and on television. He and Terry appeared in the 1979 Steve Martin comedy The Jerk. In 1987, McGhee gave a small but memorable performance as the ill-fated blues singer Toots Sweet in the supernatural thriller movie Angel Heart. In his review of Angel Heart, the critic Roger Ebert singled out McGhee for praise, declaring that he delivered a "performance that proves [saxophonist] Dexter Gordon isn't the only old musician who can act." McGhee appeared in the television series Family Ties, in a 1988 episode entitled "The Blues, Brother", in which he played the fictional blues musician Eddie Dupre. He also appeared in the television series Matlock, in a 1989 episode entitled "The Blues Singer", playing a friend of an old blues musician (Joe Seneca) who is accused of murder. In the episode, McGhee, Seneca and star Andy Griffith perform a duet of "The Midnight Special".

Happy Traum, a former guitar student of McGhee's, edited a blues guitar instruction guide and songbook, Guitar Styles of Brownie McGhee, published in 1971, in which McGhee, between lessons, talked about his life and the blues. The autobiographical section features McGhee talking about growing up, his musical beginnings, and a history of the blues from the 1930s onward.

McGhee and Terry were both recipients of a 1982 National Heritage Fellowship awarded by the National Endowment for the Arts, which is the United States government's highest honor in the folk and traditional arts. That year's fellowships were the first bestowed by the NEA.

One of McGhee's last concert appearances was at the 1995 Chicago Blues Festival.

He died of stomach cancer on February 16, 1996, in Oakland, California, at the age of 80.

Discography

Solo albums
 Traditional Blues, Vol. 1 (Folkways Records, 1951)
 Brownie McGhee Blues (Folkways, 1955)
 Brownie McGhee Sings the Blues (Folkways, 1959)
 Traditional Blues, Vol. 2 (Folkways, 1960)
 Brownie's Blues (Bluesville, 1962)
 Blues Is Truth (Blues Alliance, 1976)
 Facts of Life (Blues Rock'It, 1985) with the Ford Blues Band

Compilation
 The Folkways Years, 1945–1959 (Smithsonian Folkways, 1991)

With Sonny Terry
 Brownie McGhee Blues (Folkways, 1955)
 Washboard Band: Country Dance Music (Folkways, 1956)
 Folk Songs of Sonny Terry and Brownie McGhee (Roulette, 1958)
 Blues with Big Bill Broonzy, Sonny Terry and Brownie McGhee (Folkways, 1959)
 Down South Summit Meetin' (World Pacific, 1960), with Lightnin' Hopkins and Big Joe Williams
 Down Home Blues (Bluesville, 1960)
 Blues Hoot (Horizon, 1961 [1963]), with Lightnin' Hopkins and Big Joe Williams
 Brownie McGhee & Sonny Terry at the 2nd Fret (Prestige, 1962)
 Sonny Is King (Bluesville, 1963)
 A Long Way from Home (BluesWay, 1969)
 I Couldn't Believe My Eyes (BluesWay, 1969 [1973])
 Sonny & Brownie (A&M Records, 1973)
 Brownie McGhee and Sonny Terry Sing (Smithsonian Folkways, 1990)
 Back Country Blues (Southern Routes, 2016)

Other
 Songs for Victory: Music for Political Action, with the Union Boys (1944)

See also
American folk music
Woody Guthrie
List of blues musicians
List of folk musicians
List of people from Tennessee
Union Boys

References

External links
Center for Southern African American Music - Brownie McGhee — McGhee bio and audio samples

 
 Series of taped interviews with Brownie McGhee

1915 births
1996 deaths
20th-century African-American male singers
20th-century American guitarists
20th-century American pianists
A&M Records artists
African-American guitarists
African-American pianists
American blues guitarists
American blues pianists
American blues singers
American folk singers
American male guitarists
American male pianists
Blues revival musicians
Country blues musicians
Deaths from cancer in California
Deaths from stomach cancer
East Coast blues musicians
Folkways Records artists
Guitarists from Tennessee
National Heritage Fellowship winners
People from Kingsport, Tennessee
People from Knoxville, Tennessee
People with polio
Piedmont blues musicians
Prestige Records artists
Roulette Records artists
Singers from Tennessee
Southland Records artists